Pococera expandens, the striped oak webworm moth or double-humped pococera moth, is a moth of the family Pyralidae. It is found in North America, where it has been recorded from Arizona, Arkansas, British Columbia, Georgia, Illinois, Indiana, Iowa, Kentucky, Louisiana, Maine, Manitoba, Maryland, Massachusetts, Mississippi, New Brunswick, New Hampshire, New Jersey, New York, North Carolina, Ohio, Oklahoma, Ontario, Pennsylvania, Quebec, South Carolina, Tennessee, Texas, Virginia, West Virginia and Wisconsin.

The wingspan is 22 mm. Adults have been recorded on wing from April to September.

The larvae feed on Quercus alba. They are gregarious in early instars and tie multiple leaves into a silken nest. These nests are often filled with frass.

References

Moths described in 1863
Epipaschiinae
Moths of North America